Bradley Potgieter (born 11 May 1989) is a South African racing cyclist. He rode at the 2013 UCI Road World Championships.

References

External links

1989 births
Living people
South African male cyclists
Sportspeople from Pietermaritzburg